is the fourth spin-off anime series in the Yu-Gi-Oh! franchise and the sixth anime series overall by Nihon Ad Systems and TV Tokyo. It is directed by Satoshi Kuwahara and produced by Studio Gallop. The series aired in Japan on TV Tokyo between April 11, 2011 and September 24, 2012. A second series, Yu-Gi-Oh! Zexal II, began airing from October 7, 2012. The series also premiered on The CW's Toonzai programming block in the United States on October 15, 2011. The story follows the young duelist Yuma Tsukumo who partners up with an ethereal spirit named Astral, as they search for the 100 Number Duel Monsters cards, which will restore Astral's memories and power.

Six pieces of theme music are used for the series: three opening and three ending themes. For the 4Kids and Konami English dub versions, the opening theme is "Take a Chance" for all episodes.

Series overview

Episode list

Season 1: Number Hunter (2011)

Season 2: World Duel Carnival (2011–12)

Season 3: World Duel Carnival Finals (2012)

Specials

See also
List of Yu-Gi-Oh! Zexal II episodes – The follow-up series to Yu-Gi-Oh! Zexal

References
General

Specific

Zexal *
Yu-Gi-Oh! Zexal